This is a list of municipalities on the Great Lakes, arranged alphabetically by the body of water on which they are located. This list does not include locations officially classified as cities.

Towns and municipalities located on rivers between two lakes 
 Detroit, Michigan
 Grosse Ile, Michigan
 Sarnia, Ontario
 Point Edward, Ontario
 Windsor, Ontario

Lake Erie 
 Amherstburg, Ontario
 Essex, Ontario
 Kingsville, Ontario
 Leamington, Ontario
 Chatham–Kent, Ontario

Lake Huron 
 Collingwood, Ontario
 Killarney, Ontario
 Meaford, Ontario
 Midland, Ontario
 Parry Sound, Ontario
 Penetanguishene, Ontario
 Port McNicoll, Ontario
 Port Severn, Ontario
 Waubaushene, Ontario
 Victoria Harbour, Ontario
 Tobermory, Ontario

Lake Michigan

Lake Ontario 
 Ajax, Ontario
 Whitby, Ontario
 Clarington, Ontario
 Port Hope, Ontario
 Cobourg, Ontario
 Quinte West, Ontario
 Greater Napanee, Ontario

Lake Superior 
Wawa

See also 
 List of cities on the Great Lakes

Great Lakes
Great Lakes
Municipalities